The Lees Of Laughter's End is a novella by Canadian author Steven Erikson, set in the world of his Malazan Book of the Fallen epic fantasy series. It continues the storyline of Bauchelain, Korbal Broach and Emancipor Reese, three characters who had a cameo appearance in the novel Memories of Ice and were the focus for the previous two novellas, Blood Follows and The Healthy Dead. Although this novella was written after The Healthy Dead, its place in the storyline is immediately following Blood Follows and prior to The Healthy Dead.

The novella was published in the United Kingdom by PS Publishing in March 2007.

External links
 
 

2007 British novels
British fantasy novels
Malazan Book of the Fallen
British novellas
Novels by Steven Erikson
PS Publishing books